The ACM Software System Award is an annual award that honors people or an organization "for developing a software system that has had a lasting influence, reflected in contributions to concepts, in commercial acceptance, or both". It is awarded by the Association for Computing Machinery (ACM) since 1983, with a cash prize sponsored by IBM of currently $35,000.

Recipients
The following is a list of recipients of the ACM Software System Award:

See also
 Software system
 List of computer science awards

References

External links
 Software System Award — ACM Awards

Awards established in 1983
Software System Award
Computer science awards